Perria or Pehria is a fairy-like mountain figure in Albanian mythology and folklore.

Etymology

From the Albanian word përrua ("brook").
From Proto-Albanian *pVrē/ān-, or Proto-Albanian *per-rāno, possibly a prefixed derivative of rrua. Compare Romanian pârâu (“torrent, stream”), assimilated to râu (“river”). Alternatively, from Old Albanian përruo, from Bulgarian порой (poroj, “torrent”).
Other similar words include the English language word poar.

Description
Perria, is generally a protective figure, however she can also do harm. In Albanian popular belief, she is depicted as female mountain-spirits clad in white. Their duty is to punish anyone who is wasteful with bread by disfiguring the person and making him a "crooked hunchback".

See also

 Zana e malit
 Shtojzovalle
 Ora
 Fatia
 Bardha
 Nëna e Vatrës
 E Bukura e Dheut
 Prende
 Kulshedra

Sources

Citations

Bibliography

Albanian legendary creatures
Albanian folklore